Elohim Rolland (born 3 March 1989) is a French footballer who plays as a midfielder. He is currently playing for [Le Touquet AC] in France.

Personal life
Rolland was born in Chamonix, France, and is of Algerian descent.

References

1989 births
Living people
People from Chamonix
Association football midfielders
French footballers
French sportspeople of Algerian descent
Belgian Pro League players
Lyon La Duchère players
US Boulogne players
K.V. Kortrijk players
FC Villefranche Beaujolais players
French expatriate footballers
Expatriate footballers in Belgium
Sportspeople from Haute-Savoie
Footballers from Auvergne-Rhône-Alpes